St. Joseph Church is parish of the Roman Catholic Church in Cumberland, Rhode Island within the Diocese of Providence. It is known for its historic campus at 1303 Mendon Road, which includes a Gothic Revival style church along with two late 19th-century, clapboard-sheathed, wood-frame structures on the east side of Mendon Road. The church and its accompanying buildings were added to the National Register of Historic Places in 1982 as St. Joseph's Church Complex.

History
St. Joseph's Parish, established in 1872 in an earlier church constructed on the present site, was, at that time, the only Roman Catholic church between Valley Falls and Woonsocket. It served an extensive parish centered on the Irish, and later French Canadian and Italian, mill laborers of nearby Ashton and Berkeley, as an important religious and social center. By 1888, the parish's growth necessitated construction of a new church, which replaced the original, although the rectory and parish hall were retained. According to the State Survey put out by the Rhode Island Historical Preservation and Heritage Commission in 1998, the present church is one of the finest wooden Late Victorian religious edifices in Rhode Island. It was added to the National Register of Historic Places in 1982 and underwent an extensive and sensitive restoration in 1995.

Architecture
The handsome, asymmetrical, twin-spired Gothic Revival St. Joseph's Church was designed around 1888-1890 by architect F.E. Page. The building has a tall, end-gable-roof, rectangular mass with a polygonal, hip-roof apse at the northeast end. One-story, shed-roof side aisles continue around the apse as an ambulatory to connect to a projecting, rectangular chapel. The three-story, shorter corner tower has paired lancet windows, battlemented string courses, louver-filled Gothic arches, and is topped by a broach spire. The four-story tower has large, traceried Gothic windows, drip molds, and is surmounted by an octagonal belfry and spire.

St. Joseph's Rectory (c. 1872) is two to three stories in height with a modified cruciform plan. It is a well-preserved example of bracketed style domestic architecture, with a wrap-around veranda and applied ornament of carved brackets and jigsaw work. The interior has been modified.

The relatively plain parish hall (c. 1872) has been removed and a modern structure has been built at the rear of the property.

Gallery

See also
 National Register of Historic Places listings in Providence County, Rhode Island

References

External links 

Churches in the Roman Catholic Diocese of Providence
Roman Catholic churches completed in 1888
Churches on the National Register of Historic Places in Rhode Island
Buildings and structures in Cumberland, Rhode Island
Churches in Providence County, Rhode Island
French-Canadian culture in Rhode Island
Irish-American culture in Rhode Island
Italian-American culture in Rhode Island
National Register of Historic Places in Providence County, Rhode Island
Gothic Revival church buildings in Rhode Island
1872 establishments in Rhode Island
Religious organizations established in 1872
19th-century Roman Catholic church buildings in the United States